Matte World Digital was a visual effects company based in Novato, California that specialized in realistic matte painting effects and digital environments for feature films, television, electronic games and IMAX large-format productions. The company closed in 2012 after 24 years of service in the entertainment industry.

History
The company, initially called Matte World, was co-founded in 1988 by visual effects supervisor Craig Barron, matte painter Michael Pangrazio, and producer Krystyna Demkowicz. Barron and Pangrazio had worked together at Industrial Light & Magic, starting in 1979, when they helped create the matte-effects shots for George Lucas' The Empire Strikes Back. Barron and Pangrazio continued to work with the crew at ILM on notable matte-painting scenes in several classic features including Raiders of the Lost Ark, and E.T. the Extra-Terrestrial. Barron left ILM in 1988 after serving four years as supervisor of photography in the company’s matte department.

The Matte World team formed to provide realistic matte-painting effects for film and television. In 1992, the company was renamed Matte World Digital, reflecting the new technological tools available to matte painters. Since then, MWD has created digital-matte environments for films directed by (among others) Martin Scorsese, Francis Ford Coppola, James Cameron, and David Fincher.

After working on shots for more than 100 films, Matte World Digital closed its shop in August, 2012.

Digital innovations 
MWD was the first visual-effects company to apply radiosity rendering to film in Martin Scorsese’s Casino (1995). Recreating the 1970s-era Las Vegas strip was made possible by simulating the indirect bounce-light effect of millions of neon lights. Radiosity rendering allowed for the first true simulation of bounce-light in a computer-generated environment.

For David Fincher’s The Curious Case of Benjamin Button, one of MWD’s challenges was to create 29 digital matte paintings of a New Orleans train station and its various looks throughout time: new, run-down, and remodeled. To accomplish all these scenes from one 3D model, the company used Next Limit’s Maxwell rendering software—an architectural visualization tool—revamping the software to accurately mimic real-world lighting.

When Fincher requested a low-altitude helicopter shot over Paris, Barron took digital reference photos from a helicopter flying over the city at a higher altitude (as required since 9/11). Then the team at MWD used a flight simulator to determine aerial views at a lower height. Once the height and angles were worked out on the simulator and approved by Fincher, a high-resolution CG model was built for a completely computer-generated flight shot.

Awards 
Craig Barron won the 2009 Academy of Motion Picture Arts and Sciences and BAFTA Awards for achievement in visual effects for MWD's work in David Fincher’s The Curious Case of Benjamin Button. He was also nominated for achievement in visual effects by the Academy and BAFTA for shots created at MWD for Batman Returns (1992) and The Truman Show (1998). Barron, along with MWD team members, Michael Pangrazio, Charlie Mullin and Bill Mather, won an Emmy for outstanding visual effects for By Dawn's Early Light in 1990.

Matte World Digital is listed 76th in Animation Career Review's "Top 100 Most Influential Animation Studios of All-Time."

Selected filmography 
Hugo, 2011
Captain America: The First Avenger, 2011
Alice in Wonderland, 2010
Terminator Salvation, 2009
X-Men Origins: Wolverine, 2009
The Curious Case of Benjamin Button, 2008
The Golden Compass, 2007
Zodiac, 2007
Invincible, 2006
Greece: Secrets of the Past, 2006
The Work and the Glory, 2004
Catwoman, 2004
The Last Samurai, 2003
The Ring, 2002
Lewis & Clark: Great Journey West, 2002
Murder by Numbers, 2002
The Majestic, 2001
Jay and Silent Bob Strike Back, 2001
Jurassic Park III, 2001
Cats & Dogs, 2001
The Mummy Returns, 2001
Antitrust, 2001
Dr. T & the Women, 2000
X-Men, 2000
Mission: Impossible 2, 2000
The Testaments of One Fold and One Shepherd, 2000
The Green Mile, 1999
The Insider, 1999
October Sky, 1999
Soldier, 1998
Return to Paradise, 1998The Truman Show, 1998The Newton Boys, 1998Great Expectations, 1998Kundun, 1997Wag the Dog, 1997Titanic, 1997A Simple Wish, 1997Con Air, 1997The Evening Star, 1996Star Trek: First Contact, 1996The Stupids, 1996Independence Day, 1996Diabolique, 1996Broken Arrow, 1996Dunston Checks In, 1996Casino, 1995Hackers, 1995Bushwhacked, 1995Operation Dumbo Drop, 1995Tall Tale, 1995The Jungle Book, 1994Clear and Present Danger, 1994The Shadow, 1994City Slickers II: The Legend of Curly's Gold, 1994Ace Ventura: Pet Detective, 1994Ghost in the Machine, 1993Demolition Man, 1993Malice, 1993The Real McCoy, 1993Hocus Pocus, 1993Hot Shots! Part Deux, 1993A Far Off Place, 1993Sommersby, 1993Lorenzo's Oil, 1992Home Alone 2: Lost in New York, 1992Bram Stoker’s Dracula, 1992Captain Ron, 1992Batman Returns, 1992Far and Away, 1992Star Trek VI: The Undiscovered Country, 1991Terminator 2: Judgment Day, 1991Robin Hood: Prince of Thieves, 1991Flight of the Intruder, 1991Avalon, 1990Darkman, 1990Arachnophobia, 1990RoboCop 2, 1990Gremlins 2: The New Batch, 1990By Dawn's Early Light (television), 1990Prancer, 1989

 References 

Further readingThe Invisible Art: The Legends of Movie Matte Painting'' by Craig Barron and Mark Cotta Vaz, Chronicle Books, 2002; 
SIGGRAPH 1998 - Matte Painting in the Digital Age | Speech from the "Invisible Effects" series | Craig Barron | 1998

External links 

Best Visual Effects Academy Award winners
Special effects companies
Visual effects companies
Computer animation
Privately held companies based in California
Novato, California
Cinema of the San Francisco Bay Area
1988 establishments in California
2012 disestablishments in California
Defunct companies based in the San Francisco Bay Area
Entertainment companies established in 1988
Entertainment companies disestablished in 2012